Lawrence Valentine Emerson Plunkett (29 March 1910 – 25 March 1999) was an Australian rules footballer who played with Fitzroy in the Victorian Football League (VFL).

Notes

External links 

1910 births
1999 deaths
Australian rules footballers from New South Wales
Fitzroy Football Club players